The 2002–03 season was the 55th season in Vardar’s history and their tenth in the First League. Their 1st place finish in the 2001–02 season meant it was their 10th successive season playing in the First League.

In that season Vardar was won the championship for the second consecutive time.

Competitions

Overall

First League

Classification

Results summary

Results by round

Matches

Macedonian Football Cup

Champions League

Sources: RSSSF.com

Player seasonal records

Top scorers

Source: FC Vardar tripod

References

FK Vardar seasons
Vardar